The Oriental Orthodox Churches are Eastern Christian churches adhering to Miaphysite Christology, with approximately 60 million members worldwide. The Oriental Orthodox Churches are part of the Nicene Christian tradition, and represent one of its oldest branches.

As some of the oldest religious institutions in the world, the Oriental Orthodox Churches have played a prominent role in the history and culture of Armenia, Egypt, Eritrea, Ethiopia, Sudan, Western Asia and India. As autocephalous churches, their bishops are equal by virtue of episcopal ordination. Their doctrines recognize the validity of only the first three ecumenical councils.

The Oriental Orthodox Churches are composed of six autocephalous churches: the Coptic Orthodox Church of Alexandria, the Syriac Orthodox Church of Antioch (Jacobite Syrian Christian Church), the Armenian Apostolic Church, the Malankara Orthodox Syrian Church, the Ethiopian Orthodox Tewahedo Church, and the Eritrean Orthodox Tewahedo Church. They consider themselves to be the one, holy, catholic, and apostolic Church founded by Jesus Christ in his Great Commission, and that its bishops are the successors of Christ's apostles. Three rites are practiced by the churches: the western-influenced Armenian Rite, the West Syriac Rite of the Syriac Church and the Malankara Church of India, and the Alexandrian Rite of the Copts, Ethiopians and Eritreans.

Oriental Orthodox Churches shared communion with the Roman Church before the Council of Chalcedon in 451 AD, and with the Church of the East until the Council of Ephesus in AD 431, separating primarily over differences in Christology.

The majority of Oriental Orthodox Christians live in Egypt, Ethiopia, Eritrea, India, Syria, Turkey and Armenia, with smaller Syriac communities in Western Asia—decreasing due to persecution. There are also many in other parts of the world, formed through diaspora, conversions, and missionary activity.

Name and characteristics
The name "Oriental Orthodox Churches" was coined for the Conference of Addis Ababa in 1965. At the time there were five participating churches, the Eritrean Church not yet being autocephalous.

Other names by which the churches have been known include Old Oriental, Ancient Oriental, Lesser Eastern, Anti-Chalcedonian, Non-Chalcedonian, Pre-Chalcedonian, Miaphysite or Monophysite, although the Church of the East is equally anti-, non- and pre-Chalcedonian. The Roman Catholic Church has referred to these churches as "the Ancient Churches of the East".

Theology and ecclesiology
The Oriental Orthodox Churches are distinguished by their recognition of only the first three ecumenical councils during the period of the State church of the Roman Empire: the First Council of Nicaea in 325, the First Council of Constantinople in 381 and the Council of Ephesus in 431.

Oriental Orthodoxy shares much theology and many ecclesiastical traditions with the Eastern Orthodox Church; these include a similar doctrine of salvation and a tradition of collegiality between bishops, as well as reverence of the Theotokos and use of the Nicene Creed.

The primary theological difference between the two communions is the differing Christology. Oriental Orthodoxy rejects the Chalcedonian Definition, and instead adopts the miaphysite formula, believing that the human and divine natures of Christ are united. Historically, the early prelates of the Oriental Orthodox Churches thought that the Chalcedonian Definition implied a possible repudiation of the Trinity or a concession to Nestorianism.

The break in communion between the Imperial Roman and Oriental Orthodox churches did not occur suddenly, but rather gradually over 2-3 centuries following the Council of Chalcedon. Eventually the two communions developed separate institutions, and the Oriental Orthodox did not participate in any of the later ecumenical councils.

The Oriental Orthodox Churches maintain their own ancient apostolic succession. The various churches are governed by holy synods, with a primus inter pares bishop serving as primate. The primates hold titles like patriarch, catholicos, and pope. The Alexandrian Patriarchate, the Antiochian Patriarchate along with Rome, was one of the most prominent sees of the early Christian Church.

Oriental Orthodoxy does not have a magisterial leader like the Roman Catholic Church, nor does the communion have a leader who can convene ecumenical synods like the Eastern Orthodox Church.

Some Oriental Orthodox Churches such as the Coptic Orthodox, Ethiopian Orthodox, Eritrean Orthodox, places a heavier emphasis on Old Testament teachings than one might find in other Christian denominations, and its followers adhere to certain practices: following dietary rules that are similar to Jewish Kashrut, require that their male members undergo circumcision, and observes ritual purification.

Non-Chalcedonian Christology

The schism between Oriental Orthodoxy and the adherents of Chalcedonian Christianity was based on differences in Christology. The First Council of Nicaea, in 325, declared that Jesus Christ is God, that is to say, "consubstantial" with the Father. Later, the third ecumenical council, the Council of Ephesus, declared that Jesus Christ, though divine as well as human, is only one being, or person (hypostasis). Thus, the Council of Ephesus explicitly rejected Nestorianism, the Christological doctrine that Christ was two distinct persons, one divine (the Logos) and one human (Jesus), who happened to inhabit the same body. The churches that later became Oriental Orthodoxy were firmly anti-Nestorian, and therefore strongly supported the decisions made at Ephesus.

Twenty years after Ephesus, the Council of Chalcedon reaffirmed the view that Jesus Christ was a single person, but at the same time declared that this one person existed "in two complete natures", one human and one divine.

At times, Chalcedonian Christians have referred to the Oriental Orthodox as being monophysites—that is to say, accusing them of following the teachings of Eutyches (c. 380 – c. 456), who argued that Jesus Christ was not human at all, but only divine. Monophysitism was condemned as heretical alongside Nestorianism, and to accuse a church of being monophysite is to accuse it of falling into the opposite extreme from Nestorianism. However, the Oriental Orthodox themselves reject this description as inaccurate, having officially condemned the teachings of both Nestorius and Eutyches. They define themselves as miaphysite instead, holding that Christ has one nature, but this nature is both human and divine.

Modern alignments
Today, Oriental Orthodox Churches are in full communion with each other, but not with the Eastern Orthodox Church or any other churches; the Oriental Orthodox Churches, while in communion, do not form a single church as the Catholics or Eastern Orthodox. Slow dialogue towards restoring communion between the two Orthodox groups began in the mid-20th century, and dialogue is also underway between Oriental Orthodoxy and the Catholic Church and others. In 2017, the mutual recognition of baptism was restored between the Coptic Orthodox Church of Alexandria and the Catholic Church. Also baptism is mutually recognized between the Armenian Apostolic Church and the Catholic Church.

The Oriental Orthodox Churches are generally considered to be more conservative with regard to social issues as well as enthusiastic about ecumenical relations with non-Oriental Orthodox Christian Churches. All Oriental Orthodox Churches are members of the World Council of Churches.

History

Post-Council of Chalcedon (AD 451)
The schism between the Oriental Orthodox and the rest of Christendom occurred in the 5th century. The separation resulted in part from the refusal of Pope Dioscorus I of Alexandria and the other thirteen Egyptian bishops to accept the Christological dogmas promulgated by the Council of Chalcedon, which held that Jesus is in two natures: one divine and one human. They would accept only "of or from two natures" but not "in two natures".

To the hierarchs who would lead the Oriental Orthodox, the latter phrase was tantamount to accepting Nestorianism, which expressed itself in a terminology incompatible with their understanding of Christology. Nestorianism was understood as seeing Christ in two separate natures, human and divine, each with different actions and experiences; in contrast Cyril of Alexandria advocated the formula "One Nature of God the Incarnate Logos" (or as others translate, "One Incarnate Nature of the Word"), stressing the unity of the incarnation over all other considerations. It is not entirely clear that Nestorius himself held the condemned beliefs that are generally referred to as "Nestorianism."

The Oriental Orthodox Churches were therefore often called "monophysite", although they reject this label, as it is associated with Eutychian monophysitism; they prefer the term "miaphysite".

In the years following Chalcedon the patriarchs of Constantinople intermittently remained in communion with the non-Chalcedonian Patriarchs of Alexandria and Antioch (see Henotikon), while Rome remained out of communion with the latter and in unstable communion with Constantinople. It was not until 518 that the new Byzantine Emperor, Justin I (who accepted Chalcedon), demanded that the church in the Roman Empire accept the council's decisions.

Justin ordered the replacement of all non-Chalcedonian bishops, including the patriarchs of Antioch and Alexandria. The extent of the influence of the Bishop of Rome in this demand has been a matter of debate. Justinian I also attempted to bring those monks who still rejected the decision of the Council of Chalcedon into communion with the greater church. The exact time of this event is unknown, but it is believed to have been between 535 and 548.

Saint Abraham of Farshut was summoned to Constantinople and he chose to bring with him, four monks. Upon arrival, Justinian summoned them and informed them that they would either accept the decision of the council or lose their positions. Abraham refused to entertain the idea. Theodora tried to persuade Justinian to change his mind, seemingly to no avail. Abraham himself stated in a letter to his monks that he preferred to remain in exile rather than subscribe to a faith which he believed to be contrary to that of Athanasius of Alexandria.

20th century
By the 20th century the Chalcedonian schism was not seen with the same importance, and from several meetings between the authorities of the Holy See and the Oriental Orthodoxy, reconciling declarations emerged in the common statement of Syriac Patriarch Mar Ignatius Zakka I Iwas and the Roman Pope John Paul II in 1984:

The technical reason for the schism was that the bishops of Rome and Constantinople excommunicated the non-Chalcedonian bishops in 451 for refusing to accept the "in two natures" teaching, thus declaring them to be out of communion.

Worship
Before praying, they wash their hands and face in order to be clean before and present their best to God; shoes are removed in order to acknowledge that one is offering prayer before a holy God. In this Christian tradition, it is customary for women to wear a Christian headcovering when praying.

Organization

The Oriental Orthodox Churches are a communion of six autocephalous (that is, administratively completely independent) regional churches. Each church may or may not have defined geographical boundaries of its jurisdiction and is ruled by its council of bishops or synod presided by a senior bishop–its primate (or first hierarch). The primate may carry the honorary title of pope (in the Alexandria tradition), patriarch, abuna (in the Axumites tradition) or catholicos.

Each regional church consists of constituent eparchies (or, dioceses) ruled by a bishop. Some churches have given an eparchy or group of eparchies varying degrees of autonomy (self-government). Such autonomous churches maintain varying levels of dependence on their mother church, usually defined in the document of autonomy.

Below is a list of the six autocephalous Orthodox churches forming the main body of Oriental Orthodox Christianity, all of which are titled equal to each other. Based on the definitions, the list is in the alphabetical order, with some of their constituent autonomous churches and exarchates listed as well.

Alexandrian Rite
Coptic Orthodox Church of Alexandria
 French Coptic Orthodox Church
 Ethiopian Orthodox Tewahedo Church
 Eritrean Orthodox Tewahedo Church
 Syro-Antiochene Rite
Syriac Orthodox Church of Antioch
Jacobite Syrian Christian Church
 Malankara Orthodox Syrian Church
Armenian Rite
Armenian Apostolic Church
 Mother See of Holy Etchmiadzin
 Armenian Patriarchate of Constantinople
 Armenian Patriarchate of Jerusalem
 Holy See of Cilicia

There are a number of churches considered non-canonical, but whose members and clergy may or may not be in communion with the greater Oriental Orthodox communion. Examples include the Celtic Orthodox Church, the Ancient British Church, and lately the British Orthodox Church. These organizations have passed in and out of official recognition, but members rarely face excommunication when recognition is ended. The primates of these churches are typically referred to as episcopi vagantes or vagantes in short.

Adherents

According to the Encyclopedia of Religion, Oriental Orthodoxy is the Christian tradition "most important in terms of the number of faithful living in the Middle East", which, along with other Eastern Christian communions, represent an autochthonous Christian presence whose origins date further back than the birth and spread of Islam in the Middle East.

It is the dominant religion in Armenia (94%) and ethnically Armenian unrecognized Nagorno-Karabakh Republic (95%).

Oriental Orthodoxy is a prevailing religion in Ethiopia (43.1%), while Protestants account for 19.4% and Islam - 34.1%. It is most widespread in two regions in Ethiopia: Amhara (82%) and Tigray (96%), as well as the capital city of Addis Ababa (75%). It is also one of two major religions in Eritrea (40%).

It is a minority in Egypt (<20%), Sudan (3–5%), Syria (2–3% out of the 10% of total Christians), Lebanon (10% of the 40% of Christians in Lebanon or 200,000 Armenians and members of the Church of the East) and Kerala, India (7% out of the 20% of total Christians in Kerala). In terms of total number of members, the Ethiopian Church is the largest of all Oriental Orthodox churches, and is second among all Orthodox churches among Eastern and Oriental Churches (exceeded in number only by the Russian Orthodox Church).

Also of particular importance are the Armenian Patriarchate of Constantinople in Turkey and the Armenian Apostolic Church of Iran. These Oriental Orthodox churches represent the largest Christian minority in both of these predominantly Muslim countries, Turkey and Iran.

Internal disputes
There are numerous ongoing internal disputes within the Oriental Orthodox Churches. These disputes result in lesser or greater degrees of impaired communion.

Armenian Apostolic
The least divisive of these disputes is within the Armenian Apostolic Church, between the Catholicosate of Etchmiadzin and the Catholicosate of the Great House of Cilicia. The division of the two Catholicosates stemmed from frequent relocations of church headquarters due to political and military upheavals.

The division between the two sees intensified during the Soviet period. The Holy See of Etchmiadzin was seen as a captive Communist puppet by some Western bishops and clergy. Sympathizers of this established congregations independent of Etchmiadzin, declaring loyalty instead to the See based in Antelias in Lebanon. The division was formalized in 1956 when the Antelias (Cilician) See broke away from the Etchmiadzin See. Though recognising the supremacy of the Catholicos of All Armenians, the Catholicos of Cilicia administers the clergy and dioceses independently. The dispute, however, has not at all caused a breach in communion between the two churches.

Ethiopia
In 1992, following the abdication of Abune Merkorios and election of Abune Paulos, some Ethiopian Orthodox bishops in the United States maintained that the new election was invalid, and declared their independence from the Addis Ababa administration forming separate synod. On 27 July 2018, representatives from both synods reached an agreement. According to the terms of the agreement, Abune Merkorios was reinstated as Patriarch alongside Abune Mathias (successor of Abune Paulos), who will continue to be responsible for administrative duties, and the two synods were merged into one synod, with any excommunications between them lifted.

India
Indians who follow the Oriental Orthodox faith belong to the Malankara Orthodox Syrian Church and the Jacobite Syrian Christian Church. The two churches were united before 1912 and after 1958, but again separated in 1975. The Malankara Orthodox Syrian Church, also known as the Indian Orthodox Church, is an autocephalous church. It is headed by the Catholicos of the East and Malankara Metropolitan. The Jacobite Syrian Christian Church is an autonomous body of the Syriac Orthodox Church in India. It is headed by regional head Catholicos of India.

The Malabar Independent Syrian Church also follows the Oriental Orthodox tradition, but is not in communion with other Oriental Orthodox churches.

Occasional confusions
The Assyrian Church of the East is sometimes incorrectly described as an Oriental Orthodox church, though its origins lie in disputes that predated the Council of Chalcedon and it follows a different Christology from Oriental Orthodoxy. The historical Church of the East was the church of Greater Iran and declared itself separate from the state church of the Roman Empire in 424–27, years before the Ecumenical Councils of Ephesus and Chalcedon. Theologically, the Church of the East was affiliated with the doctrine of Nestorianism, and thus rejected the Council of Ephesus, which declared Nestorianism heretical in 431. The Christology of the Oriental Orthodox Churches in fact developed as a reaction against Nestorian Christology, which emphasizes the distinctness of the human and divine natures of Christ.

See also

 Interparliamentary Assembly on Orthodoxy
 List of Christian denominations
 Oriental Orthodoxy in North America

References

Sources

External links

Orthodox Joint Commission
The Standing Conference of Oriental Orthodox Churches in America
Encyclical, Pope Benedict XIV, Allatae Sunt (On the observance of Oriental Rites), 1755 
Common Declaration of Pope John Paul II and HH Mar Ignatius Zakka I Iwas
Joint Declarations Between the Syriac Orthodox and Roman Catholic Churches
Dialogue with the Oriental Orthodox Churches on the Anglican Communion Website 
Dialogue with the Oriental Orthodox Churches on the Vatican Website 
The Rejection of the Term Theotokos by Nestorius Constantinople